Nina Björk (born May 18, 1967 in Östersund, Jämtland) is a Swedish feminist, author and journalist. She is most well known for Under det rosa täcket (Under the Pink Duvet), a feminist book written in 1996.

She is considered to be a left-wing equity feminist. In 2008 she earned her PhD degree in literary criticism at Gothenburg University with her doctorate thesis Fria Själar. She is also well known as a columnist in Dagens Nyheter.

Bibliography
Under det rosa täcket, 1996, 
Sireners sång, 1999, 
Fria själar, 2008, 
Lyckliga i alla sina dagar, 2012, 
Drömmen om det röda : Rosa Luxemburg, socialism, språk och kärlek, 2016, 
''Om man älskar frihet: Tankar om det politiska, 2020,

References

1967 births
Living people
People from Östersund
Swedish feminists
Academic staff of the University of Gothenburg